Netrokona is a district of the Mymensingh Division in northern Bangladesh.

Etymology
The headquarters of Netrokona District was located at the end of the Mogra River and was called Natorkona. Many people believe that over a period of time, Natorkona became Netrakona.

Geography
Netrokona is situated in the northern part of Bangladesh, along the border with the Indian state of Meghalaya. There are five main rivers in Netrokona: Kangsha, Someshawri, Dhala, Magra, and Teorkhali. It is a part of the Surma-Meghna River System. Much of the district becomes a haor during the monsoon.

It lies between 24°34’ and 25°12’ north latitudes and between 90°00’ and 91°07’ east longitudes.

Netrokona District is bounded by the Garo Hills in Meghalaya, India on the north, Sunamganj District on the east, Kishoreganj District on the south and Mymensingh District on the west.

Netrokona Pouroshabha is a municipal town, established in 1887 and with 13.63 km2.

History
Shah Sultan Rumi migrated to Netrokona in 1053 CE where he preached the religion of Islam to the local people. He is believed to have been the earliest Sufi saint to have visited Bengal. During the Mughal period, a three-domed mosque was constructed in modern-day Atpara. In 1880, the British Raj approved the area as a mahakuma administrative region. It was effective on 3 January 1882 when the region was officially named as Netrakona Mahakuma before that it was named by Kaliganj. During the British period, Shyam Biswas, a Bengali Hindu zamindar, was noted to be very cruel and abusive towards the inhabitants living in his land. He had certain regulations, such as no one passing his front yard wearing shoes or slippers. Social reformers from the village of Amati, Sonafor Uddin, Muktul Husayn Khan, Shariat Khan, Anfar Uddin, Manfar Uddin and Jafar Uddin organised people against this humiliation, rising against Biswas. Their revolution was soon followed in other parts of the district.

During the Bangladesh Liberation War, freedom fighters attacked the Atpara Thana on 19 August 1971. They murdered the Officer-in-Charge of the Thana as well as a number of Razakars, and they also looted arms and ammunition from the Thana. On 7 October, a battle was fought in Atpara, leading to the death of three more Razakars.

The Government of Bangladesh converted Netrakona Mahakuma to Netrokona District on 17 January 1984.

Administration 
Netrokona district is divided into ten upazilas.
Atpara Upazila
Barhatta Upazila
Durgapur Upazila
Khaliajuri Upazila
Kalmakanda Upazila
Kendua Upazila
Madan Upazila
Mohanganj Upazila
Netrokona Sadar Upazila
Purbadhala Upazila

Demographics

According to the 2011 Bangladesh census, Netrokona District had a population of 2,229,642, of which 1,111,306 were males and 1,118,336 females. Rural population was 1,982,459 (88.91%) while the urban population was 247,183 (11.09%). Netrokona had a literacy rate of 39.44% for the population 7 years and above: 40.88% for males and 38.03% for females.

Muslims are the largest population with 89.78%, while Hindus are the largest minority with 9.30%. There is a small minority of Christians who are 0.82% of the population. The district of Netrakona consists of 3146 mosques, 958 temples, 183 churches and eight Buddhist temples. Hindus are most concentrated in the haors bordering Sylhet.

Bengalis are the dominant group present here. The ethnic minority population is 25,247, mainly Garo, Hajong, Hodi and Bana people.

Economy
The economy of Netrakona is largely agrarian. Susang Durgapur, an Upazila of Netrakona, is one of the major sources of the country's China-Clay used for ceramic products. Its vast water bodies (Haor) provide a wide variety of fish. Bara Bazar and Choto Bazar is commerce centre of Netrakona.

Tourist attractions
 Durgapur : The Garo hills of Durgapur is the most popular tourist attraction of Netrakona.
 Birishiri : There is a Tribal Cultural Academy. And also have a historical big pond called Sagor Dighi.
 Haor : Haor is a large area of water spaces. Biggest hawor is located in Mohongonj and Khaliajuri . Dingaputa is one of the biggest hawor among them.
 Madanpur Mazar (Shah Sultan Rumi): It is situated 8 km south to the Netrokona Town.
 Ranikong Mission

Notable people 
Abu Taher, military serviceman
Ahsan Habib- Writer, Cartoonist
Akhlakul Hossain Ahmed, Politician
Bir Muktijuddah Meher Ali, Politician
Bari Siddiqui, He was a Bangladeshi singer-songwriter, flautist and folk musician.
Golam Samdani Koraishi, writer
Helal Hafiz, Writer and poet.
Humayun Ahmed, Author, dramatist, and film director.
Jalal Uddin Talukder, Former Member of Parliament. 
Kanha, a 10th-century poet
Khalekdad Chowdhury, reputed Bangladeshi writer, playwright and novelist
Mustafa Jabbar,  President of Bangladesh Association of Software and Information Services (BASIS), President of Bangladesh Computer Samity
Mustaque Ahmed Ruhi, Former Member of Parliament 
Nirmalendu Goon, Writer, poet, painter.
Raushan Yazdani, author and folklorist
Shahabuddin Ahmed, former President of Bangladesh
Muhammad Zafar Iqbal, author, physicist, professor and activist. He is a professor of computer science and engineering at Shahjalal University of Science and Technology.
Moni Singh, a Bangladeshi Politician, Founder Of the Communist Party of East Pakistan.
Lutfozzaman Babar, Former State Minister of Home Affairs
Abu Hider, cricketer
Ashraf Ali Khan Khasru,Former State Minister of Fisheries and Livestock, Current State Minister of Social Welfare 
 Arif Khan Joy, Former Deputy Minister of Youth And Sports

See also
Districts of Bangladesh
Dhaka Division

Notes

References

External links
 Official website

 
Districts of Bangladesh
Districts of Mymensingh Division